Feschaeria amycus is a moth in the Castniidae family. It has been recorded from Guyana, Brazil, Venezuela and Tobago.

References

Moths described in 1779
Castniidae